Inquisitor vividus is a species of sea snail, a marine gastropod mollusk in the family Pseudomelatomidae, the turrids and allies.

Description
The length of the shell attains 23.2 mm, its diameter 7 mm.

Distribution
This marine species occurs in the South China Sea

References

External links
  Baoquan Li 李宝泉 & R.N. Kilburn, Report on Crassispirinae Morrison, 1966 (Mollusca: Neogastropoda: Turridae) from the China Seas; Journal of Natural History 44(11):699-740 · March 2010; DOI: 10.1080/00222930903470086

vividus
Gastropods described in 2010